"No Me Mires Más" is a song by Kendji Girac featuring Soprano from the album Ensemble.

The song currently has 150 million views.

Charts

Weekly charts

Year-end charts

References

2016 singles
2016 songs
French-language songs
Kendji Girac songs